Peperomia pereskiifolia is a species of plant in the genus Peperomia of the family Piperaceae. It is native to Venezuela.

References

pereskiifolia
Flora of Venezuela